Dairy is a significant part of the total agricultural output of the state of Vermont. The state has 645 dairy farms milking cattle, sheep, and/or goats which produced 2.7 billion pounds of milk in 2019. Vermont ranks 15th in the United States for raw milk production.

Dairy farming in Vermont, like in much of the US, is increasingly scaling upwards due to market and governmental pressures. Each year, Vermont loses dairy farms. In 2019, the state lost an average of 48 dairy farms. Over the years of 2018 and 2019, the state lost about 140 dairy farms.

Family farms with small herds of dairy cows have historically defined Vermont agriculture and the cultural landscape of the state. A 2019 survey found that Vermont's Dairy Industry is considered very important to 72% of Vermonters.

Vermont produces a significant amount of cheese, butter, and yogurt that are consumed across the United States. There are over 140 firms in the state that process milk into dairy products. Some of its better known producers are Vermont Creamery, Cabot Creamery, Ehrmann Commonwealth Dairy, Jasper Hill Farm, and the Grafton Village Cheese Company.

The Crowley Cheese Factory in Healdville, Vermont is believed to be the oldest indigenous manufacturer of cheese in the United States.

The dairy industry is celebrated by various parades and festivals throughout the year. The two most notable are The Strolling of the Heifers parade in Brattleboro and the Vermont Dairy Festival in Enosburg Falls. Each year the Vermont Cheese Council runs the Vermont Cheesemakers Festival.

The COVID-19 pandemic lead to milk dumping.

Vermont dairy farms donated milk to schools during the pandemic.

History
Dairy farming is the primary source of agricultural income in Vermont. In the second half of the 20th century, developers had plans to build condos and houses on what was relatively inexpensive, open land. Vermont's government responded with a series of laws controlling development and with some pioneering initiatives to prevent the loss of Vermont's dairy industry. Still, the number of Vermont dairy farms has declined more than 85% from the 11,206 dairy farms operating in 1947. In 2003 there were fewer than 1,500 dairy farms in the state; in 2006 there were 1,138; in 2019 there were 658. The number of dairy farms has been diminishing by 10% annually. 80% of open land is controlled by dairy farms.

The number of cattle in Vermont had declined by 40%; however, milk production has doubled in the same period due to tripling the production per cow. While milk production rose, Vermont's market share declined. Within a group of states supplying the Boston and New York City markets (called "Federal order Class I"), Vermont was third in market share, with 10.6%; New York has 44.9% and Pennsylvania has 32.9%. In 2007 dairy farmers received a record $23.60 for  (11.63 gallons at $2.03/gallon) of milk. This dropped in 2008 to $17 ($1.46/gallon). The average dairy farm produced  pounds of milk annually in 2008.

The dairy barn remains an iconic image of Vermont, but the 87% decrease in active dairy farms between 1947 and 2003 means that preservation of the dairy barns has increasingly become dependent upon a commitment to maintaining a legacy rather than basic need in the agricultural economy. The Vermont Barn Census, organized by a collaboration of educational and nonprofit state and local historic preservation programs, has developed educational and administrative systems for recording the number, condition, and features of barns throughout Vermont.

In 2009, there were 543 organic farms. Twenty percent of the dairy farms were organic and 23% (128) vegetable farms were organic. Organic farming increased in 2006–07, but leveled off in 2008–09.

A significant amount of milk is shipped into the Boston market. Therefore, the Commonwealth of Massachusetts certifies that Vermont farms meet Massachusetts sanitary standards. Without this certification, a farmer may not sell milk for distribution into the bulk market. In 2019, two-thirds of all milk in New England was produced by Vermont dairies.

Further reading
https://sevendaysvt.com/vermont/vermonts-last-dairy-farmer-lawmaker-is-selling-his-cows/Content?oid=29580937
https://www.vpr.org/vpr-news/2021-09-30/vermont-organic-dairy-farms-fight-to-survive-as-industry-consolidates

Notes 

Milk
Economy of Vermont
Agriculture in Vermont
Vermont culture
Dairy farming in the United States